The Geneva Cubs was the final moniker of the minor league baseball team located in Geneva, New York. Their home stadium was at McDonough Park.

Geneva teams played in the Border League (1947–1951) and New York–Penn League (1958–1973, 1977–1993).

Geneva teams were an affiliate of the Chicago Cubs (1977–1993), Minnesota Twins (1973), Texas Rangers (1972), Washington Senators (1970–1971), Pittsburgh Pirates (1969), Washington Senators/Texas Rangers (1963–1968), Cincinnati Reds (1958–1962) and Brooklyn Dodgers (1949).

Baseball Hall of Fame member Tony Perez Played for Geneva in 1960–1961. All-time MLB hits leader Pete Rose played for Geneva in 1960.

History
The Geneva Cubs were a member of the New York–Penn League. However the team can be traced back to 1947 as the Geneva Red Birds, a member of the Border League. The team's name changed a year later to the Geneva Robins and was affiliated with Brooklyn Dodgers in 1949. Geneva disbanded their team on June 26, 1951, and the rest of the league folded a few weeks later.

Geneva next played in 1958, rejoining as a member of the New York–Penn League and playing as the Geneva Redlegs, as affiliate the Cincinnati Redlegs. The affiliation lasted until 1963, when the team was renamed the Geneva Senators and became affiliated with the Washington Senators. In 1969 the team briefly became the Geneva Pirates and were affiliated with the Pittsburgh Pirates. The team once again took up the Senators name in 1970. In 1973 the team became an affiliate of the Minnesota Twins and were renamed the Geneva Twins.  After a four-year hiatus the team took the Cubs name and began their affiliation with the Chicago Cubs from 1977 to 1993, after which time they moved to Williamsport, Pennsylvania. The franchise still exists today, as the Williamsport Crosscutters.

The ballpark
Beginning in 1958, Geneva teams played at McDonough Park. The ballpark is still in use as home to the Geneva RedWings, a collegiate summer baseball franchise. The address is 180 Lyceum Street, Geneva, New York, 14456.

Timeline

Notable alumni

Baseball Hall of Fame alumni
Tony Perez (1960–1961) Inducted, 2000

Notable alumni
Brant Alyea (1962)
Rich Amaral (1983)
Dick Billings (1965)
Dave Bristol (1958, MGR) Cincinnati Reds Hall of Fame
Jim Bullinger (1986)
Alex Cabrera  (1993)
Paul Casanova (1963-1964) MLB All-Star
Jack Cassini (1960, MGR)
Frank Castillo (1987)
Mike Cubbage (1971)
Doug Dascenzo (1985)
Brian Doyle (1972)
Scott Fletcher (1979)
Matt Franco (1988)
Owen Friend (1963, MGR)
Gus Gil (1959)
Doug Glanville (1991)
Tom Grieve (1967) Texas Rangers Hall of Fame
Mel Hall (1979)
Mike Hargrove (1972) MLB All-Star; 1974 AL Rookie of the Year; Cleveland Indians Hall of Fame
Billy Hatcher (1981)
Bobby Jones (1967)
Bruce Kison (1969)
Karl Kuehl (1961–1962, MGR)
Craig Lefferts (1979)
Bill Madlock (1970) 3× MLB All-Star; 4× NL batting champion (1975, 1976, 1981, 1983)
Dave Martinez (1983) Manager: 2019 World Series Champion Washington Nationals
Don Mason (1965)
Jim Mason (1968)
Jamie Moyer (1984) MLB All-Star; Seattle Mariners Hall of Fame
Camilo Pascual (1951) 7× MLB All-Star; Minnesota Twins Hall of Fame
Greg Pryor (1971)
Pete Rose (1960) Baseball All-time hits leader (4,256); Cincinnati Reds No. 14 retired; Cincinnati Reds Hall of Fame
Chico Ruiz (1958)
Art Shamsky (1960)
Charlie Small (1949–1950, MGR)
Dwight Smith (1985)
Frank Taveras (1969)
Kent Tekulve (1969) MLB All-Star
Wayne Terwilliger (1964-1965, MGR)
Stan Thomas (1971)
Mike Thompson (1967)
Cesar Tovar (1959, 1961)
Steve Trachsel (1991) MLB All-Star
Gary Ward (1973) 2x MLB All-Star
Rick Wilkins (1987)
John Wockenfuss (1967-1968)
Al Woods (1973)

References 

Border League teams
Defunct New York–Penn League teams
Defunct baseball teams in New York (state)
Cincinnati Reds minor league affiliates
Chicago Cubs minor league affiliates
Texas Rangers minor league affiliates
Brooklyn Dodgers minor league affiliates
Pittsburgh Pirates minor league affiliates
Minnesota Twins minor league affiliates
Washington Senators (1961–1971) minor league affiliates
1947 establishments in New York (state)
1993 disestablishments in New York (state)
Baseball teams established in 1947
Baseball teams disestablished in 1993